Festuca polycolea is a species of grass which is endemic to India.

Description

Spikelets are oblong and solitary with pedicelled fertile spikelets that carry 3–5 fertile florets. The glumes are chartaceous, lanceolate, and keelless, have acute apexes, with only difference is in size. Flowers have three stamens while the fruits are caryopses with an additional pericarp and linear hilum.

References

polycolea
Flora of the Indian subcontinent